The 2009 Southern Conference baseball tournament was held at Fluor Field at the West End in Greenville, South Carolina, from May 20 through 24. Second seeded  won the tournament and earned the Southern Conference's automatic bid to the 2009 NCAA Division I baseball tournament. It was Georgia Southern's fourth SoCon tournament win.

The tournament used a modified two bracket, double-elimination format. The teams that emerge from the loser's bracket on each side switch to the other bracket and play the team emerging from each winner's bracket, with the surviving teams playing a one-game final. Only the top eight teams participate, so Wofford, UNC Greensboro, and Davidson were not in the field.

Seeding

Brackets

Bracket One

Bracket Two

Final

Game Summaries

Round One

Round Two

Round Three

Round Four

Final

All-Tournament Team

References 

Tournament
Southern Conference Baseball Tournament
SoCon baseball tournament
Southern Conference baseball tournament
Baseball competitions in Greenville, South Carolina
College baseball tournaments in South Carolina